Campaign of Hate: Russia and Gay Propaganda is a 2014 American documentary about LGBT rights in Russia directed by Scott Stern and Michael Lucas.

Synopsis 
Michael Lucas interviews various LGBT advocates in Moscow, Russia.  Topics include homophobia in Russian society, gay bashing, the Russian LGBT propaganda law, and Vladimir Putin's administration.

Interviewees 
 Masha Gessen, an activist who left Russia following talk of a Russian law that would take children away from LGBT couples
 Thor Halvorssen Mendoza, founder of Human Rights Foundation
 Wanja Kilber, activist
 Anton Krasovsky, a journalist who came out as gay on national television
 Alexander Kargaltsev, photographer and filmmaker
 Manny de Guerre and Gulya Sultanova, organizers of Side by Side
 Elena Kostyuchenko, journalist and activist
 Mitya Aleshkovsky, photographer
 Marina Melnik, activist
 Andrey Obolensky, activist
 Dmitry Potapov, an immigrant seeking asylum in the US
 Vitaly Milonov, a legislator responsible for the LGBT propaganda law

Production 
Lucas invested $100,000 of his own money in the documentary.  Shooting took place in Russia over the course of a month.
A Kickstarter campaign was launched in December 2013 to complete post-production.  Lucas, who had previously renounced his Russian citizenship and emigrated to the US, said that he neither enjoyed being back in Russia nor filming the documentary; however, he felt that someone had to do so.  During his interview with Milonov, Lucas said that he attempted to remain as calm as possible in order to allow Milonov's remarks to speak for themselves.  Although it was not included in the theatrical release, Lucas said he engaged in a debate with Milonov late in the interview, during which Milonov became angry and left.  Lucas cited weak opposition in the West to Russia's policies as one of the reasons why he shot the documentary.  He said that he hoped to keep the issue in the news by highlighting it.

Release 
Campaign of Hate was released on DVD on April 1, 2014, and video on demand in May 2014.

Reception 
Out wrote, "This film isn't Lucas walking away from Russia, but a clear-eyed, unsentimental look at a country that demonize LGBTs in a concerted, violent, and dangerous way for political gain."  David Lewis of the San Francisco Chronicle wrote, "The film, which puts the campaign of hate into political context, includes LGBT folks from all walks of Russian life, and we can't help but marvel at their courage in a time of such peril."  WBOC-TV rated it 3/5 stars and wrote, "It's good as a series of testimonies, but, as a complete documentary, it's rather lacking."

References

External links 
 
 
 

2014 films
2014 documentary films
American documentary films
American LGBT-related films
2010s English-language films
2010s Russian-language films
LGBT rights in Russia
Documentary films about Russia
Documentary films about violence against LGBT people
Films directed by Michael Lucas
2014 LGBT-related films
2010s American films